The Shan State Kokang Democratic Party (SSKDP) is a political party in Myanmar.

History
Following the reintroduction of multi-party democracy after the 8888 Uprising, the party contested two seats in the 1990 general elections. It received 0.05% of the vote, winning one seat; U Yankyin Maw in Kunlong.

The party re-registered on 31 August 2012, and contested the 2015 general election, but failed to win a seat.

References

Political parties in Myanmar